Carlos Miguel Coronel (born 29 December 1996) is a Brazilian professional footballer who plays as a goalkeeper for Major League Soccer club New York Red Bulls.

Club career

Early career
Born in Porto Murtinho, Brazil, Carlos Coronel started his career with the youth setup of Red Bull Brasil. At Red Bull Brasil he was called up to the first team and served as a substitute goalkeeper in the São Paulo State Cup several times in the 2013 and 2014 seasons, but did not play.

Red Bull Salzburg
In the summer of 2015 he moved to Austrian Bundesliga club FC Red Bull Salzburg. However, he was soon after loaned to Salzburg reserve club FC Liefering playing in 2. Liga. He made his debut for Liefering in July 2015, when he was in the starting line-up against SKN St. Pölten on the second match day of the 2015-16 season.

In May 2018 he made his debut for Salzburg in the Bundesliga appearing as a starter against FK Austria Wien. He remained as a regular starter for FC Liefering during the 2017-18 season playing in 32 matches for the second division side.

Philadelphia Union (loan)
On 24 January 2019. Coronel joined Major League Soccer club Philadelphia Union on loan from Red Bull Salzburg. While with Philadelphia, Coronel appeared in 4 league matches plus 8 matches with affiliate side Bethlehem Steel FC, before being recalled by Salzburg in July 2019.

Return to Salzburg
Amid an injury crisis after Cican Stankovic was injured and substitute goalkeeper Alexander Walke had been injured for a long time, Coronel made his UEFA Champions League debut after coming on for Stankovic on 23 October 2019 against SSC Napoli in a 2-3 loss. On 6 November 2019, he helped Salzburg to a 1-1 draw against SSC Napoli in the UEFA Champions League, garnering praise for his performance in the match. He ended the 2019-20 season making five appearances in the Bundesliga, one in the ÖFB-Cup and three in the Champions League as Salzburg won the cup and league double that season.

New York Red Bulls (loan)
On 26 February 2021, Coronel joined Major League Soccer club New York Red Bulls on loan from Red Bull Salzburg. On 17 April 2021, Coronel made his debut for New York, appearing as a starter in a 2-1 loss to Sporting Kansas City. On 1 May 2021, he recorded his first shutout for New York in a 2-0 victory over Chicago Fire FC. On 17 October 2021, Coronel recorded his eleventh clean sheet of the season in a 1-0 victory over rival New York City FC  in the Hudson River Derby. Coronel ended his first season with New York appearing in 34 league matches and recording 13 clean sheets.

New York Red Bulls
On 6 December 2021, it was announced that New York had acquired Coronel on a permanent deal from Red Bull Salzburg, signing a three year deal with the club. On 22 June 2022, Coronel helped New York to advance to the semifinals of the 2022 U.S. Open Cup, keeping a clean sheet in a 3-0 victory over local rival New York  City FC.On 31 August 2022, Coronel helped New York to a 1-0 victory over CF Montréal, helping his club register its record ninth road win of the season.

Career statistics

Honours
Red Bull Salzburg
Austrian Bundesliga (2): 2017–18, 2019–20
Austrian Cup (2): 2018–19, 2019–20

References

External links

 

1996 births
Living people
Brazilian footballers
FC Liefering players
FC Red Bull Salzburg players
Philadelphia Union players
2. Liga (Austria) players
Brazilian expatriate footballers
Brazilian expatriate sportspeople in Austria
Expatriate footballers in Austria
Association football goalkeepers
Major League Soccer players
Philadelphia Union II players
USL Championship players
New York Red Bulls players